Roland Lynch (died 1625) was Anglican clergyman who served in the Church of Ireland as the Bishop of Kilmacduagh from 1587 to 1625.

A native of Galway, he was the Archdeacon of Clonfert when nominated to the bishopric of Kilmacduagh by Queen Elizabeth I on 9 January 1587. He was appointed to the see by letters patent on 14 June and  consecrated to the Episcopate in August 1587. Fifteen years later, he was granted in commendam the bishopric of Clonfert on 14 February 1602. It was said that he impaired the revenues of both sees by granting improper leases. He died in office at Loughrea in December 1625.

References

Bibliography

  
 

1625 deaths
Bishops of Clonfert (Church of Ireland)
16th-century Anglican bishops in Ireland
Year of birth unknown
Bishops of Kilmacduagh
Archdeacons of Clonfert